Frederick William Anderson (September 28, 1883 – April 28, 1955) was a civil engineer, rancher and political figure in British Columbia. He represented Kamloops in the Legislative Assembly of British Columbia from 1916 to 1924, as a Liberal.

He was born in Ottawa, Ontario, the son of William Anderson, and was educated in Ottawa and at McGill University. After working on a number of large construction projects across Canada, Anderson moved to Kamloops, British Columbia, where he operated a farm and raised livestock. He married Marion Claire, the daughter of Gordon Edward Corbould. Anderson served as government whip in the assembly. He was a lieutenant in the Canadian Engineers of the Canadian Expeditionary Force. Anderson died in Vancouver at the age of 71.

References 

1883 births
1955 deaths
British Columbia Liberal Party MLAs
McGill University alumni